Diffring is a surname. Notable people with the surname include:

Anton Diffring (1918–1989), German actor
Jacqueline Diffring (1920–2020), German-British sculptor, sister of Anton